Stegner is a German name; as a surname, it may refer to:

Jansson Stegner (born 1972), artist based in New York
Julia Stegner (born 1984), German model
Page Stegner (1937–2017), writer and historian specializing in the American old west
Ralf Stegner (born 1959), German politician (SPD)
Sarah Stegner, American chef
Wallace Stegner (1909–1993), American historian, novelist, short story writer, and environmentalist

See also
Stegner Fellowship program, a two-year creative writing fellowship at Stanford University